Salix pierotii, the Korean willow, is a species of willow native to northeast China, far eastern Russia, the Korean peninsula and Japan. They are shrubs or trees reaching 8m. Because their twisted wood is not good for timber or making tools, in Japan Salix pierotii trees are used to demarcate property lines between farms.

Forms
One form is currently accepted:

Salix pierotii f. auricomans Kimura

References

pierotii
Plants described in 1867
Trees of Korea